Jean-Louis Gasset (born 9 December 1953) is a French former midfielder and current manager of Ivory Coast.

Football career
Born in Montpellier, Gasset played his whole career with hometown club Montpellier HSC.

He led Montpellier to victory in the UEFA Intertoto Cup in 1999. He then coached SM Caen and FC Istres. He was assistant to Luis Fernández at Paris Saint-Germain F.C. and Spain's RCD Espanyol.

Gasset assisted Laurent Blanc as manager of FC Girondins de Bordeaux, the France national team and PSG from 2007 to 2016. He had the top job at Montpellier again for the second half of the 2016–17 season, finishing 15th. He then became Óscar García Junyent's right-hand man at AS Saint-Étienne, and succeeded the Spaniard in December 2017 just an hour before a 2–1 loss at EA Guingamp.

In June 2018, having turned Saint-Étienne's season around to finish sixth, missing out on the UEFA Europa League on goal difference to Bordeaux, Gasset was given another year in the job. A year later, having come fourth and secured a place in that European competition, he resigned due to disputes with the board over transfer budgets.

Gasset was hired by Bordeaux on 12 August 2020, after Paulo Sousa's exit. On 27 July 2021 he left the club.

On 20 May 2022, he was appointed coach of Côte d'Ivoire. He succeeds Patrice Beaumelle, whose contract expired on 6 April 2022.

Managerial career

Managerial statistics

References

External links
Jean-Louis Gasset at Soccerway

1953 births
Living people
Footballers from Montpellier
French footballers
Montpellier HSC players
Ligue 1 players
Ligue 2 players
French football managers
Paris Saint-Germain F.C. non-playing staff
Montpellier HSC managers
Stade Malherbe Caen managers
FC Istres managers
AS Saint-Étienne managers
FC Girondins de Bordeaux managers
Ligue 1 managers
Ivory Coast national football team managers
Association football midfielders